Paraskevi  is a village in the municipal unit of Aigio, Achaea, Greece. It is located in a hilly area, 3 km west of Kounina and 11 km southwest of Aigio. Paraskevi had a population of 251 in 2011. It was severely damaged by the 2007 Greek forest fires.

Population

External links
 Paraskevi GTP Travel Pages

See also

List of settlements in Achaea

References

Aigialeia
Aigio
Populated places in Achaea